Zoran Vujović (Serbian Cyrillic: Зоран Вујовић; born 25 February 1986) is a Serbian footballer who plays a forward for 07 Vestur.

Career
Zoran Vujović Born in Kragujevac, began his career in his native Serbia playing for young team FK Partizan. In 2012 he moved to FC Tatabánya and played in Hungarian NB II. 2013 January, he moved to FK Novi Pazar to play in Serbian SuperLiga.

Vujovic left Vendsyssel FF on 1 January 2016.

References

External links
 

1986 births
Living people
Sportspeople from Kragujevac
Serbian footballers
Serbian expatriate footballers
Association football midfielders
FK Teleoptik players
FK Partizan players
FK Metalac Gornji Milanovac players
FK Banat Zrenjanin players
FC Tatabánya players
FK Novi Pazar players
FK Metalurg Skopje players
Agrotikos Asteras F.C. players
Vendsyssel FF players
FK Dinamo Vranje players
B68 Toftir players
07 Vestur players
Serbian SuperLiga players
Serbian First League players
Nemzeti Bajnokság II players
Macedonian First Football League players
Danish 1st Division players
1. deild karla players
Serbian expatriate sportspeople in Hungary
Serbian expatriate sportspeople in North Macedonia
Serbian expatriate sportspeople in Greece
Serbian expatriate sportspeople in Denmark
Serbian expatriate sportspeople in Iceland
Serbian expatriate sportspeople in the Faroe Islands
Expatriate footballers in Hungary
Expatriate footballers in Greece
Expatriate footballers in North Macedonia
Expatriate men's footballers in Denmark
Expatriate footballers in Iceland
Expatriate footballers in the Faroe Islands